The Harry Hurt Building is a historic site in Opa-locka, Florida. It is located at 490 Opa-locka Boulevard, on the corner of Ali-Baba Avenue. On March 22, 1982, it was added to the U.S. National Register of Historic Places.

This property is part of the Opa-locka Thematic Resource Area, a Multiple Property Submission to the National Register.

References

Opa-locka Community Development Corp.

External links

 Dade County listings at National Register of Historic Places
 Harry Hurt Building at Florida's Office of Cultural and Historical Programs

Buildings and structures in Miami-Dade County, Florida
National Register of Historic Places in Miami-Dade County, Florida
Opa-locka, Florida